Tamás Horváth (born 29 April 1991, in Kaposvár) is a Hungarian football player who currently plays for Kaposvári Rákóczi FC.

Club statistics

Updated to games played as of 28 April 2013.

References
Player profile at HLSZ 

1991 births
Living people
People from Kaposvár
Hungarian footballers
Association football midfielders
Kaposvári Rákóczi FC players
Nemzeti Bajnokság I players
Sportspeople from Somogy County